The twelve-volume Catalogue of Political and Personal Satires Preserved in the Department of Prints and Drawings in the British Museum is the primary reference work for the study of British satirical prints of the 18th and 19th century.  Most of the content of the catalogue is now available through the British Museum's on-line database.

Description
The BM Satires comprises twelve volumes compiled between 1870 and 1954 and provides a catalogue raisonné of the 17,000 odd satirical prints assembled in the 19th century by Edward Hawkins, Keeper of Antiquities in the British Museum from his own and other collections.

It includes works by all the leading artists and makers of satirical prints of the period, as well as lesser known and anonymous designers. Notable artists represented include:   Henry Alken, Samuel Alken, William Austin, James Bretherton, Charles Bretherton, Henry William Bunbury, Frederick George Byron, John Cawse, John Collet, Thomas Colley, George Cruikshank, Isaac Cruikshank, Robert Cruikshank, Mary Darly, Matthew Darly, William Dickinson, Robert Dighton, John Dighton, John Doyle, William Elmes, Francis Jukes, James Gillray, Henry Heath, William Heath, William Hogarth, Samuel Howitt, John Kay, John Leech, Lewis Marks, Philip James de Loutherbourg, Richard Newton, Victor Marie Picot, Piercy Roberts, Thomas Rowlandson, F.Sansom, James Sayers, John Raphael Smith, C.Starck, Edward Topham, Raphael Lamar West, Henry Wigstead, Samuel de Wilde, Charles Williams, and  George "Moutard" Woodward. Some works by foreign printmakers are also included.

The catalogue allocates a unique identifier to each print which is widely used as a bibliographic reference to specific caricatures in books about caricatures and in sales catalogues. The identifiers are one to five digit numbers, allocated in sequential order of listing within the whole sequence of volumes, each volume covering a monotonically increasing range of numbers. For example; BM Satires 10101 refers to a print listed in Volume VIII (which covers the range 9693 to 11703) that was published in September 1803, titled My Ass in a Band Box. For each print, the catalogue provides a title, publisher, designer and creator if known, image description, lettering and inscriptions, dimensions, bibliographic references, and explanatory notes about the historical context and personages and printmaking technique (e.g. etching, aquatint, stipple, hand-coloured, etc.). The prints are for the most part in historical order of date of publication, though some appear out of chronological order in addenda that appear in later volumes. Within each year, Political and Social satire is arranged separately and sequentially.

There is a prefatory essay to each volume by the editor giving a historical synopsis of printmaking, artists, publishers and events through the period covered by the volume; including Rudolph Ackermann, Bowles & Carver, Henry Brookes, Thomas Cornell, Elizabeth Dacheray, Mary Darly, Matthew Darly, John Fairburn, Samuel William Fores, Valentine Green, William Holland, Hannah Humphrey, William Humphrey, Elizabeth Jackson, Eleanor Lay, John Kay, Thomas Maclean, John Raphael Smith, Susan Vivares and many others.

History
The first five volume of the catalogue were compiled under Frederic George Stephens between 1870 and 1883, with the assistance of Edward Hawkins, Keeper of Antiquities for the British Museum. The last seven volumes were the magnum opus of Mary Dorothy George the distinguished historian of British satire.  In 2008–12, as part of the British Museum's program to digitalise its collections, all the volumes were scanned and used to form the basis of the entries for the satirical prints in the British Museum on-line catalogue.  Digital images are now available for most of the prints.

Limitations
The BM Satires does not include prints acquired by the British Museum since the publication of the printed version of the catalogue (i.e. after 1954). The British Museum online catalogue includes additional entries for more recent acquisitions. The printed volumes include only a few images, mostly in the introductory essays.

Volumes

References

Notes
 British Museum PDF

External links
 On line catalogue

1870 books
Catalogues
Caricature
Prints and drawings in the British Museum
Art history books
British satire